The enigmatic scale is an unusual musical scale, with elements of both major and minor scales, as well as the whole-tone scale.  It was originally published in a Milan journal as a musical challenge, with an invitation to harmonize it in some way.

Overview
The enigmatic scale was invented by a professor of music at the Bologna Conservatory, Adolfo Crescentini.  On August 5, 1888, Ricordi’s Gazzetta musicale di Milano challenged its readers to compose a piece that harmonized against this scale.  The Gazzetta published several solutions to this “scala-rebus” (scale-puzzle), including one by Crescentini, yet the whole affair might have become obscure had not Italian composer Giuseppe Verdi later composed his own solution, which became the basis of the "Ave Maria (sulla scala enigmatica)" (1889, revised 1898), part of the Quattro Pezzi Sacri (1898) [4 sacred pieces].  It has been described as "that still almost incomprehensible into-one-another-gliding of harmonies over the entirely 'unnatural' scala enigmatica". The piece features the scale both in its harmonies and as a cantus firmus throughout the short piece in whole-note values in the bass and then each successively higher voice accompanying, "queer counterpoint which...is far-fetched and difficult of intonation; [and] the total effect is almost, if not quite, as musical as it is curious".

The version of the scale starting on C is as follows:

C, D, E, F, G, A, B, C

The scale has a general formula of:

1 – 2 – 3 – 4 – 5 – 6 – 7

With the musical steps as following: Semitone, Tone and a half, Tone, Tone, Tone, Semitone, Semitone.

The scale lacks a perfect fourth and a perfect fifth above the starting note. Both the fourth and fifth degrees of a scale form the basis of standard chord progressions, which help establish the tonic.

The scale was used by guitarist Joe Satriani in his piece "The Enigmatic" from Not of This Earth (1986), Monte Pittman with the song "Missing" on "The Power Of Three", and by pianist Juan María Solare in his piano miniature "Ave Verdi" (2013). It was also used in the song "Enigma" from the 1989 album The Spin by the Yellowjackets composed by Russell Ferrante and Jimmy Haslip .

References

Further reading
Hewitt, Michael. 2013. Musical Scales of the World. The Note Tree. .

Heptatonic scales
Hemitonic scales
Tritonic scales
Musical scales with augmented seconds